is a junction passenger railway station in the city of Isumi, Chiba, Japan, operated by the East Japan Railway Company (JR East) and the third-sector railway operator Isumi Railway.

Lines
Ōhara Station is served by the JR East Sotobō Line and the Isumi Railway Company Isumi Line. Limited express Wakashio services from Tokyo to  stop at this station.

Station layout
The JR East station consists of one side platform and an island platform serving three tracks. The station has a Midori no Madoguchi staffed ticket office. The Isumi Railway has a single bay platform serving two tracks. The two station buildings are adjacent and are connected together.

JR East platforms

Isumi Line platforms

History
Ōhara Station opened on 13 December 1899, as the terminal station of the Bōsō Railway. On 1 September 1907, the Bōsō Railway was nationalized and became part of the Japanese Government Railways, which became the Japanese National Railways (JNR) after World War II.

Freight operations were discontinued from 1 February 1984. The station was absorbed into the JR East network upon the privatization of JNR on 1 April 1987. On 24 March 1988, the Kihara Line was split off from the JR East network to be operated by the third-sector Isumi Railway.

Passenger statistics
In fiscal 2019, JR East's Ōhara Station was used by an average of 1,402 passengers daily (boarding passengers only). In fiscal 2018, the Izumi Railway portion of the station was used by an average of 324 passengers daily.

Surrounding area
 Isumi City Office
 Ōhara Fishing Port
 Ōhara High School

See also
 List of railway stations in Japan

References

External links

 JR East station information 
 Isumi Railway station information 

Railway stations in Japan opened in 1899
Railway stations in Chiba Prefecture
Sotobō Line
Stations of East Japan Railway Company
Isumi Line
Isumi